Cynthia Geary (born March 21, 1965) is an American actress. She is best known for her role as Shelly Tambo on the television series Northern Exposure (1990–1995), which earned her two Primetime Emmy Award nominations.

Early life 
Encouraged at an early age by her mother (a voice and music teacher), Geary studied ballet, voice, and piano. She earned a Bachelor of Arts degree in vocal performance from the University of Mississippi, where she was a member of Delta Delta Delta sorority.

Career 
Her acting career began with a series of national commercials, including spots for Coca-Cola and General Motors. She soon had numerous guest starring roles on a variety of television programs, made-for-television movies and independent films, including a small part in Smoke Signals, a film based on the short stories of Native American author Sherman Alexie.  Geary played the mother of the Olsen twins in their 1992 made-for-TV movie To Grandmother's House We Go, appeared in the 1997 movie When Time Expires, and is the female lead in 8 Seconds. She received Primetime Emmy nominations—two years in a row (1992, 1993)--for Best Supporting Actress, based on her role in Northern Exposure (1990-1995), an ensemble comedy set in rural Alaska. She voiced the character of Katia Anderson in the second game of the Professor Layton video game series, Professor Layton and the Diabolical/Pandora's Box.

Personal life 
Geary married real estate broker Robert Coron in 1994. They divorced in 2018.  They have two daughters.

Filmography

Film

Television

References

External links 
 

1965 births
Living people
American film actresses
American television actresses
Actresses from Mississippi
Actors from Jackson, Mississippi
University of Mississippi alumni
21st-century American women